Road Trip: Beer Pong (also known as Road Trip 2: Beer Pong or simply Road Trip 2) is a 2009 American road-comedy film. The film is a direct-to-DVD sequel to the 2000 Todd Phillips comedy film Road Trip and directed by Steve Rash. The only original cast members to return for the sequel were DJ Qualls and Rhoda Griffis. The film was produced by Paramount Famous Productions as Paramount Pictures, having acquired the rights to DreamWorks SKG's back catalog in its 2006 purchase of the company. The film was released on August 11, 2009.

Plot 
Andy (Preston Jones) is egged on by his best friends to stop worrying so much about his girlfriend, Katy Hartman (Julianna Guill), back-home and start enjoying college life to the fullest. While enjoying his life, he remembers Jenna, an old girlfriend from home who is now a beer pong model and becomes infatuated with her. Andy and his friends decide to hit the road chasing Jenna and her model friends to compete in a beer pong tournament, but their plans get complicated when Katy decides to transfer to his university so she can be closer to him. They call on a son of a rich despot, Arash (Danny Pudi), who hopes to get him to sponsor their road trip but instead are taken into custody by the CIA, who interrogate them and dump them in Bethesda. They steal a taxi and continue their journey, but make a pit stop in family run strip clip, only to run afoul of a gang of bikers. Short of cash, they pick up a hitchhiker hoping she will pay for a ride. Instead, she holds up a convenience store and steals the taxi.

Korkin (Michael Trotter) prays for rescue and a school bus full of beautiful girls appears. The driver, Sarah (Leandra Terrazzano), is the daughter of the reverend who founded "Chastity Until Marriage" and quickly sees through their lies but agrees to continue their road trip to Nashville. Korkin makes it his mission to sleep with Sarah. His first attempt to "score" with Sarah is on the bus while everyone is sleeping. While Sarah sleeps with her head on his lap, Korkin removes Sarah's bra and attempts to feel her up while she sleeps. However, Arash crashes the bus and awakens everyone aboard. Arash takes a turn driving the bus while the others sleep but gets distracted by phone sex and has an accident, hitting a wild boar that becomes stuck under the truck. They stop the next day and Korkin realizes they are in Katy's hometown and they call in to her mother's house.

The gang eventually catch up with Jenna and the Beer Pong tour. A video Andy had intended as an anniversary present for Katy had been posted on the internet by Korkin. The video of him singing In the Buff has become a hit and Jenna has him perform it live on stage. The performance is also posted on the internet and Katy sees Andy kissing Jenna at the end of his performance. Meanwhile, back on the bus where Korkin meet Sarah again, she says she's inspired by Andy's song in the previous performance and starts stripping meaning she's willing to have sex with Korkin. On the other hand, Andy was trying to have sex with Jenna but couldn't since he's actually in love with Katy. Due to this fact, Jenna then decided to give her blessings to Andy and his girlfriend. However, shortly after leaving Jenna's trailer, Andy gets a call from an enraged Katy that she wants to end their relationship. Heartbroken and angry at Korkin since it his idea that the gang went for the road trip, he went to see Korkin who was still having sex with Sarah. After berating with Korkin, Andy and the gang begin competing in the beer pong tournament. The film ends when Katy eventually ends up at the Beer Pong tournament and makes amends with Andy.

Cast 
 Preston Jones as Andy
 Michael Trotter as Korkin
 Nestor Aaron Absera as Jake
 Danny Pudi as Arash
 Julianna Guill as Katy Hartman
 Daniel Newman as Raz-r
 Julia Levy-Boeken as Jenna
 Leandra Terrazzano as Sarah
 Christina Bibby as Heidi
 Kimberly Banta as Momma Hartman
 Mary Cobb as Lydia
 DJ Qualls as Kyle Edwards
 Rhoda Griffis as Tour Group Mom

References

External links 
 
 

2009 films
2000s teen comedy films
2000s sex comedy films
American teen comedy films
American sex comedy films
Direct-to-video sequel films
2000s English-language films
2000s comedy road movies
American comedy road movies
Paramount Pictures direct-to-video films
Films directed by Steve Rash
DreamWorks Pictures films
2009 comedy films
2000s American films